Rhadinastis is a genus of moth in the family Cosmopterigidae.

Species
Rhadinastis loraria Meyrick, 1917
Rhadinastis melitocosma Meyrick, 1931
Rhadinastis microlychna Meyrick, 1897
Rhadinastis phoenicopa Meyrick, 1907
Rhadinastis serpula Meyrick, 1932
Rhadinastis sideropa Meyrick, 1897

References
Natural History Museum Lepidoptera genus database

Cosmopterigidae